These are the official results of the athletics competition at the 2013 Jeux de la Francophonie which took place on 10–14 September 2013 in Nice, France.

Men's results

100 meters

Heats – September 10Wind:Heat 1: -1.1 m/s, Heat 2: -1.4 m/s

Final – September 11

200 meters

Heats – September 13Wind:Heat 1: -1.5 m/s, Heat 2: -1.7 m/s, Heat 3: -0.9 m/s

Final – September 14

400 meters
September 12

800 meters

Heats – September 10

Final – September 11

1500 meters

Heats – September 13

Final – September 14

5000 meters
September 14

10,000 meters
September 10

110 meters hurdles
September 11

400 meters hurdles

Heats – September 13

Final – September 14

3000 meters steeplechase
September 14

4 x 100 meters relay
September 12

4 x 400 meters relay
September 14

20 kilometers walk
September 14

High jump
September 14

Pole vault
September 13

Long jump
September 11

Triple jump
September 13

Shot put
September 10

Discus throw
September 11

Hammer throw
September 10

Javelin throw
September 12

Decathlon
September 12–13

Women's results

100 meters

Heats – September 10Wind:Heat 1: -1.4 m/s, Heat 2: -1.0 m/s, Heat 3: -1.2 m/s

Final – September 11

200 meters

Heats – September 13Wind:Heat 1: -1.6 m/s, Heat 2: -1.6 m/s

Final – September 14

400 meters

Heats – September 11

Final – September 12

800 meters

Heats – September 13

Final – September 14

1500 meters
September 12

10,000 meters
September 13

100 meters hurdles

Heats – September 12Wind:Heat 1: -2.7 m/s, Heat 2: -1.4 m/s

Final – September 13

400 meters hurdles

Heats – September 10

Final – September 11

3000 meters steeplechase
September 12

4 x 100 meters relay
September 12

4 x 400 meters relay
September 14

20 kilometers walk
September 14

High jump
September 11

Pole vault
September 11

Long jump
September 14

Triple jump
September 14

Shot put
September 14

Discus throw
September 12

Hammer throw
September 13

Javelin throw
September 14

Heptathlon
September 10–11

References
Full results

Jeux de la Francophonie
2013